Redmi is a subsidiary company owned by the Chinese electronics company Xiaomi. It was first announced in July 2013 as a budget smartphone line, and became a separate sub-brand of Xiaomi in 2019 with entry-level and mid-range devices, while Xiaomi itself produces upper-range and flagship Xiaomi (formerly Mi) phones. Redmi phones use the Xiaomi's MIUI user interface on top of Android. Models are divided into the entry-level Redmi, the mid-range Redmi Note, and the high-end Redmi K. In addition, the unrelated Mi A Android One series is also positioned in the similar market segment with Redmi devices, despite being part of the upper-range Xiaomi Mi lineup. The most significant difference from other Xiaomi smartphones is that they use less-expensive components and thus have lower prices while retaining higher specifications. In August 2014, The Wall Street Journal reported that in the second quarter of the 2014 fiscal year,  Xiaomi had a market share of 4% of smartphone shipment rankings in China. Redmi sales were attributed as a contributing factor toward this gain in shipment rankings.

Redmi is set to bring another new smartphone lineup in the budget segment in India very soon. The company has teased the new Redmi A1 smartphone which is likely to focus on the entry-level segment.

Redmi already has the regular Redmi 10a series in the same price range, but it seems the brand will give the Redmi A1 a different twist by offering it a stock Android experience.

History

2013 
The first Redmi phone Hongmi (Red Rice in Mandarin), released in China in 2013, was first launched on Xiaomi's website, with consumer sales beginning on 12 July 2013. The phone was internationally released under the Redmi brand in early 2014.

2014 
On 13 March 2014, Redmi announced that their phones had been sold out in Singapore alone, eight minutes after being made available to buy on Xiaomi's website. Criticism regarding the release of Redmi phones included the notion that the firm may be exaggerating its sales by releasing them in small batches, causing them to quickly sell out.

On 4 August 2014, The Wall Street Journal reported that in China's smartphone market, Xiaomi overtook Samsung in the second quarter of the 2014 fiscal year with a 14% market share in smartphone shipment rankings, while Samsung had a 12% market share during this time. Yulong and Lenovo both had a 12% market share during this time. Redmi sales were attributed as contributing to Xiaomi's increased shipment rankings in the smartphone market. Conversely, in the first quarter of 2014, Xiaomi held a 10.7% market share.

2015 
The Redmi Note 3 launched on 24 November 2015; unlike its predecessor, it does not have a user-changeable battery or microSD slot. It uses the MediaTek Helio X10 Octa-core 2.0 GHz Cortex-A53 SOC with the PowerVR G6200 GPU. The Snapdragon variant of the phone, released later the same year, is based on the Snapdragon 650 and has microSD support.

2016 
In July 2016, the actors Liu Shishi, Wu Xiubo and Liu Haoran became the first ambassadors of the Redmi series in China. Redmi Pro has appeared as Pro lineup in Redmi series.

On 25 August 2016, Xiaomi unveiled the Redmi Note 4, powered by MediaTek's Helio X20 deca-core processor clocked at 2.1 GHz. The device has 2 GB RAM and 16 GB of internal storage. It has a 5.5-inch Full-HD display and a 13 MP rear camera and 5 MP front camera. It runs on Android 5.1 Lollipop and is powered by a 4,100 mAh battery.

In November 2016, Xiaomi released its new budget phone, Redmi 4. It has a polycarbonate body, dual-SIM support and runs on MIUI 8 based on Android 6.0.1 Marshmallow. The Redmi 4 has a 5-inch 720x1280 pixels display, is powered by a 1.4 GHz octa-core processor, and has 2GB of RAM.

2017 
In January 2017, the Xiaomi Redmi Note 4x based on Qualcomm Snapdragon 625 Chipset became the company's first major launch of 2017. It is an upgraded version of the previously released Redmi Note 4 based on the MediaTek Helio X20 chipset. The device is known as Redmi Note 4 in regions where the original Redmi Note 4 was not released.

In December 2017, Xiaomi unveiled the Redmi 5 and 5 Plus. They are the first phones in the Redmi series with an 18:9 screen aspect ratio. The EU release was set to January 2018 and prices were set to €170 for the Redmi 5 and €215 for the Redmi 5 Plus.

2018 
In February 2018, Xiaomi unveiled the Redmi Note 5 and Note 5 Pro. They are the first phones from Xiaomi to feature facial recognition.

In May 2018, Xiaomi unveiled the Redmi S2, also known as Redmi Y2 for Indian markets.

In June 2018, Xiaomi unveiled the Redmi 6, 6A and 6 Pro. The Redmi 6 Pro is the first phone in the Redmi series with a notch similar to the iPhone X and a 19:9 screen aspect ratio.

In September 2018, Xiaomi unveiled the Redmi Note 6 Pro. It is the first phone in the Redmi series with four cameras (two cameras on the front and two cameras on the back) and constructed using 6000 series aluminium.

2019 
In January 2019, Xiaomi officially announced Redmi to be a separate sub-brand, distinct from Xiaomi.

On 10 January 2019, Redmi unveiled the Redmi Note 7 and Note 7 Pro, the first phones in the Redmi series with a 48-megapixel rear camera. The Note 7 has a Samsung GM1 image sensor, and the Note 7 Pro has a Sony IMX586 48MP image sensor. The Note 7 is powered by the Qualcomm Snapdragon 660 Octa-Core Processor clocked at 2.2 GHz, and the Note 7 Pro has an 11 nm Qualcomm Snapdragon 675 Octa-Core Processor clocked at 2.0 GHz. The Note 7 is available with 3GB RAM with 32GB storage, 4GB RAM with 64GB storage and 6GB RAM with 64GB storage. It has a 4,000mAh battery with Quick Charge 4.0. The Redmi Note 7 series of smartphones is one of the best-selling Redmi phones; over 20 million devices were sold in the 7 months from their introduction.

The Redmi K20 and K20 Pro (also marketed as the Mi 9T) are Redmi's first foray into the flagship market. The phone was launched along with the Redmi 7A in China on 28 May. The K20 Pro is powered by the flagship Snapdragon 855 processor while the K20 is powered by the newly released Snapdragon 730 and Redmi 7A is a less expensive phone with Snapdragon 439. Redmi Note 8 and Note 8 Pro were launched on 29 August, and Redmi 8 and 8A were announced in October 2019.

After emerging as a sub-brand of Xiaomi, Redmi employed the same Smartphone & AIoT dual core strategy as Xiaomi, and branched out to different product categories such as smart TVs, notebook PCs. Xiaomi also forayed into home appliances such as washing machine, and products such as luggage.

2020 
On 7 January, Redmi unveiled the Redmi K30 5G, it being Redmi's first 5G handset available in the market. The K30 is powered by the flagship Snapdragon 765G, an Octa-Core Processor clocked at 2.4 GHz. The K30 features a LCD display punchhole camera cutout with 120 Hz refresh rate.

In March, Redmi unveiled the Redmi Note 9 Pro and Redmi Note 9 Pro Max in India. Both handset models is powered by the Snapdragon 720G, an Octa-core Processor clocked at 2.3 GHz. The Redmi Note 9 Pro features a 48MP quad camera rear setup and 18W fast charge, while the Redmi Note 9 Pro Max features a 64MP quad camera rear setup and 33W fast charge. In the same month, Redmi introduced the Redmi Note 9S to the global market, rebranded from the Indian Redmi Note 9 Pro, both featuring identical design and specifications. Redmi introduced the Indian Redmi Note 9 Pro Max rebranded as the Redmi Note 9 Pro to the global market in May, both featuring identical design and specifications.

On March 24, Redmi unveiled the Redmi K30 Pro. The Redmi K30 Pro has a Sony IMX686 64MP sensor. The K30 Pro is powered by the flagship Snapdragon 865, an Octa-Core Processor clocked at 2.84 GHz. The Redmi K30 Pro is available with 6GB LPDDR4X RAM with 128GB UFS 3.0 storage, 8GB LPDDR5 RAM with 128GB UFS 3.1 storage and 8GB LPDDR5 RAM with 256GB UFS 3.1 storage.

Redmi introduced a massive 98" Redmi TV MAX at a price of RMB 19,999 which undercuts the massive screen LCD TV market.

On 26 May, Redmi unveiled the Redmi 10X Series, featuring the Redmi 10X Pro 5G, Redmi 10X 5G and Redmi 10X 4G. Both the Redmi 10X Pro 5G and Redmi 10X 5G features the MediaTek Dimensity 820, a 7 nm Octa-core Processor clocked at 2.6 GHz. Redmi 10X 4G features the MediaTek Helio G85, clocked at 2.4 GHz. Along with the introduction of the Redmi 10X Series, Redmi also introduced the Redmi TV X-series, offering big-screen TV at excellent value. Redmi also unveiled a range of notebook PCs featuring AMD Ryzen on the same day.

2021 
The quick ascent of Xiaomi to the top is well-known. In Q2, the company defeated Apple to overtake Apple as the second-largest smartphone brand globally, and it beat Samsung to take the top spot in Europe.

List of products
List is made according to Chinese names if the device has multiple names.

Redmi Series

Redmi Note Series

Redmi K Series

Redmi A Series

Redmi Pad Series

Redmi TV 
The first TV that Xiaomi introduced under the Redmi brand was the Redmi Smart TV 98-inch that debuted in China.

The Beijing-based company later expanded its Redmi TV portfolio by bringing the Redmi Smart TV X50, Redmi Smart TV X55, and the Redmi Smart TV X65 in May. The catalogue further expanded with the Redmi Smart TV A series and Redmi Smart TV A65.

As of October 2020, the screen size of Redmi TV ranges from 32" to 98", with price ranging from RMB 899 to RMB 19999.

Redmi TV 70 
The Redmi TV was launched with 4K HDR display, quad core processor and PatchWall interface. It had Dolby Audio and DTS-HD audio technologies. It went on sale in China for CNY 3,799.

Mi TV 4A 40 
The Mi TV 4A 40 Horizon Edition runs on Android TV 9.0 with “an enhanced version” of PatchWall on top. The smart TV features a 40-inch full-HD (1,920x1,080 pixels) display with 178-degree viewing angles — along with Xiaomi's proprietary Vivid Picture Engine (VPE) technology. It also comes with two speakers of 10W each that totals a 20W stereo sound output. The speakers also include DTS-HD support.

Redmi TV MAX 98 
Coming to the features, the Redmi Smart TV Max 98-inch features a 4K display with 85 percent NTSC, wide colour gamut and 192 dynamic backlight zones. The Redmi Smart TV Max 98-inch is powered by a customised 12 nm chip, and it features MEMC motion compensation for smoother animation. The television packs 4GB of RAM, and offers 64GB of storage.

Redmi TV MAX 86 Pro 5g 
Released in February 2021

Redmi TV X (50/55/65 inches) 
The TV has Reality Flow and Vivid Picture Engine as features meant to improve the viewing experience. Various sound formats are also supported, including Dolby Audio for the inbuilt speakers, Dolby Atmos pass-through over eARC, and DTS Virtual:X.

The television runs on Android TV 10, with the stock Android TV launcher and access to Google Assistant. Like other televisions from Xiaomi, it's also possible to access the PatchWall UI on the Redmi TV X Series, that is Xiaomi's content-focused, curated user interface that is popular on its Mi TV range. There is also Google Chromecast built in, and the Redmi TV range is the first from the company to have the Mi Home app for IoT products supported on the TVs.

Redmi TV A (32/43/50/55/65 inches) 
The TV packs 1.5GB of RAM and come with 8GB of internal storage. There's also Stereo Speakers that are claimed to offer more immersive sound, along with DTS decoding support.

It is running the MIUI operating system based on Android which can also be used to control smart home devices through voice commands. The company has also introduced a new Minimalist Mode so that elders can easily navigate through the interface.

Redmi Washing Machine 
As of May 2020, Redmi has a total of 2 top load washer models.

RedmiBook Laptop 
As of July 2020, Redmi has a total of 11 RedmiBook models with 18 model variations.

Redmi accessories 
Redmi accessories ranges from wireless earbuds, power banks, Internet routers to smart AI speakers.

References

 
Smart TV